The 1968–69 Denver Pioneers men's ice hockey team represented University of Denver in college ice hockey. In its 13th year under head coach Murray Armstrong the team compiled a 26–6–0 record and reached the NCAA tournament for the eighth time. The Pioneers defeated Cornell 4–3 in the championship game at the Broadmoor World Arena in Colorado Springs, Colorado. This was Denver's second consecutive championship and fifth in eleven years. Senior goaltender Gerry Powers tied the all-time NCAA career record of 76 wins in the championship match against the record-holder Ken Dryden.

Season
Denver was hoping to be the first team to defend its National Title since the 1961 Denver squad. With only three players leaving (due to graduation) Murray Armstrong's team had a good chance to repeat. Unfortunately, the team stumbles out of the gate, losing both games in its opening series at North Dakota. The Pioneers returned to Colorado for a home-and-home series against a weak Colorado College team before going back on the road. In Houghton Denver lost its third road game to Michigan Tech before finally managing a win the following night to pull their record back to even. Denver then took two games against still-building Minnesota–Duluth and ended the first part of its schedule against two national teams with the Broadmoor World Tournament. The Pioneers were able to defeat a non-olympic US Team handily before tying the Czech Team two days later (though the game was called for Denver).

The Pioneers began the new year with a series against Colgate and dominated the eastern team in both contests. After earning a road split with Michigan Denver returned to Colorado and didn't have to leave the state for the remainder of the year. Denver went 12–2 down the stretch, playing only 1 road game at Colorado College but its loss to Michigan Tech on February 1 cost the Pioneers their chance to win the Conference championship.

Denver finished as the top western seed for the WCHA Tournament and after dropping the league's poorest team (UMD) in the first game they were given a gift from Colorado College who had knocked off North Dakota in the regional semifinal. Denver's defense continued its strong play and earned the Pioneers their second consecutive WCHA title and a trip to the 1969 NCAA Tournament.

Despite having finished second in the WCHA, Denver possessed a better record and the defending national champions were given the top western seed, placing them in the semifinal against Harvard. Denver easily dispatched the Crimson 9–2, leaving only the 27–1 Cornell Big Red standing in their way. Cornell was both the top offensive and defensive team in 1968–69 and were led by the NCAA's all-time wins leader Ken Dryden. Denver, however, was able to reply with Gerry Powers, who had only one fewer wins than the future Hall of famer. The two titans clashed in one of the more anticipated national championships in history and early on it was apparent that Denver had come to play when Tom Gilmore deflected the puck past Dryden less than three minutes in. Cornell tied the game a little over 10 minutes later and the two teams ended the first ties 1-all. Both goalies continued to stymie the opposition until a Cornell penalty allowed Denver to pull ahead once more but this time it only took the Big Red two minutes to tie the game for a third time. Denver's withering attack continued to pressure Dryden and two more pucks got past the Cornell netminder to give Denver a late 2-goal edge. The drama of the contest was not finished, however, and after coincidental minors left the teams at 4-on-4, Cornell scored with the extra space then pulled Dryden to effectively give their team a power play in the final minute but Powers stood firm and allowed Denver to keep their lead and win the championship.

Keith Magnuson led the team's offence from the blueline in the title game and his three assists won him the tournament MOP. He was joined by teammates Tom Miller, Bob Trembecky and Gerry Powers on the All-Tournament first team. Powers joined a very select group of goaltenders who won consecutive national titles and was the last to do so until Hunter Shepard in 2019. Magnuson and George Morrison were named to both the AHCA All-American West Team and All-WCHA First Team while Powers and Miller made the Conference Second Team. Morrison, for leading Denver in both goals and points, won the WCHA Sophomore of the Year Award.

Standings

Schedule

|-
!colspan=12 style="color:white; background:#862633; " | Exhibition

|-
!colspan=12 style="color:white; background:#862633; " | Regular Season

|-
!colspan=12 style="color:white; background:#862633; " | 

|-
!colspan=12 style="color:white; background:#862633; " | 

† game called 1–0 for Denver.

Roster and scoring statistics

Goaltending statistics

1969 championship game

(W1) Denver vs. (E1) Cornell

Players drafted in the 1969 NHL Amateur Draft

References

Denver Pioneers men's ice hockey seasons
Denver
Denver
Denver
Denver
Denver
Denver